Alexandru Costin (born 21 October 1991, Chișinău, Moldavian SSR) is a Moldavian football defender who plays for FC Dacia Chișinău.

Club statistics
Total matches played in Moldavian First League: 10 matches - 0 goals

References

External links

Profile at FC Dacia Chișinău

1991 births
Footballers from Chișinău
Moldovan footballers
Living people
Association football defenders
FC Sfîntul Gheorghe players